Piers Francis (born 20 June 1990) is an English rugby union footballer who plays in the fly-half and occasionally inside centre position.

Career
Francis was born in Gravesend, Kent, attended Kent College, Canterbury and played for Old Gravesendians RFC & Maidstone FC. He was also a member of the Saracens Academy for three years during his teens.   He moved to New Zealand at the age of 18 and played ITM Cup rugby for both  and  before returning to the UK in 2012 to sign with Edinburgh.

He spent two years with the Edinburgh outfit, but suffered an injury in the pre-season ahead of the 2013-14 campaign which effectively kept him out of action for the whole season.

He was released in the summer of 2014 along with other fly-halves Harry Leonard and Gregor Hunter.

It was announced in November 2014 that he had signed with RFU Championship side Doncaster Knights, with the contract running until  March 2015.

For the remainder of 2015 Francis returned to New Zealand, where he linked with the ITM Cup team  on a two-year deal.

On 20 March 2017, Francis signed to return to England and join Gallagher Premiership club Northampton Saints from the 2017–18 season. This made him eligible to be picked for England again, and he was subsequently picked for England's 2017 summer tour of Argentina.

International career

International tries

References

External links
http://www.bbc.co.uk/sport/0/rugby-union/26867892
http://www.drfc.co.uk/news/piers-pens-with-knights/
https://www.northamptonsaints.co.uk/person/piers-francis

1990 births
Living people
Auckland rugby union players
Blues (Super Rugby) players
Counties Manukau rugby union players
Edinburgh Rugby players
England international rugby union players
English rugby union players
People educated at Kent College
Rugby union centres
Rugby union fly-halves
Rugby union players from Gravesend, Kent
Waikato rugby union players
Northampton Saints players